Locus (plural loci) is Latin for "place". It may refer to:

Entertainment
 Locus (comics), a Marvel Comics mutant villainess, a member of the Mutant Liberation Front
 Locus (magazine), science fiction and fantasy magazine
 Locus Award, presented to the winners of Locus magazine's annual readers' poll
 Locus (video game), a 1995 video game by Zombie Studios
 Locus (Chicago Underground Duo album), 2014
 Locus (Satyr album), 2020

Computers and mathematics
 Locus (mathematics), the set of points satisfying a particular condition, often forming a curve
 LOCUS (operating system), a distributed OS developed at UCLA, notable for single-system image idea
 Locus Computing Corporation (1982–1995), commercialized the LOCUS distributed operating system developed at UCLA
 Locus Map, an Android navigation app using maps of various providers in online and offline mode
 Locus Technologies (1997), an environmental software company that organizes data via the Internet
 Root locus, a diagram visualizing the position of roots as a parameter changes
 Wang LOCI (Logarithmic Computing Instrument), an early scientific calculator by Wang

Science
 Locus (archaeology), the smallest definable unit in stratigraphy
 Locus (genetics), the position of a gene or other significant sequence on a chromosome

Other
 Locus (rhetoric), another name for a literary or rhetorical topos, a method of constructing an argument
 Locus of control, the degree to which people have control over events
 Method of loci, a mnemonic system that uses the spatial memory of a familiar place to enhance recollection
 HTT Pléthore (Locus Plethore), a Canadian supercar proposed by HTT Automobile in Quebec, Canada
UCLouvain Faculty of Architecture, Architectural Engineering and Urban Planning (LOCI) of the University of Louvain in Belgium

See also

Loki – Trickster in Norse mythology